Amy Lynn Carter (born October 19, 1967) is the daughter of the 39th U.S. president Jimmy Carter and his first lady Rosalynn Carter. Carter entered the limelight as a child when she lived in the White House during the Carter presidency.

Early life and education 
Amy Carter was born on October 19, 1967, in Plains, Georgia. In 1970, her father was elected governor of Georgia, and then in 1976, president of the United States. She was raised in Plains until her father was elected governor, whereupon she moved with her family into the Georgia Governor's Mansion in Atlanta. She later moved to the White House at the age of 9 when her father was elected U.S. president.

Carter attended public schools in Washington during her four years in the White House; first Stevens Elementary School and then Rose Hardy Middle School.

After her father's presidency, Carter moved to Atlanta, where her senior year of high school was at Woodward Academy in College Park, Georgia. She was a Senate page during the 1982 summer session. Carter attended Brown University but was academically dismissed in 1987, "for failing to keep up with her coursework". She later earned a Bachelor of Fine Arts degree (BFA) from the Memphis College of Art and received a master's degree in art history from Tulane University in New Orleans in 1996.

Life in the White House 

In January 1977, at the age of nine, Carter entered the White House, where she lived for four years. She was the subject of much media attention during this period, as young children had not lived in the White House since the early 1960s presidency of John F. Kennedy (and would not again do so after the Carter presidency until the inauguration of Bill Clinton, in January 1993, when Chelsea moved in.)

While Carter was in the White House, she had a Siamese cat named Misty Malarky Ying Yang, which was the last cat to occupy the White House until Socks, owned by Bill Clinton. Carter also was given an elephant from Sri Lanka from an immigrant; the animal was given to the National Zoo in Washington, D.C. Carter attended public schools, including Stevens Elementary School and Hardy Middle School.

Carter roller-skated through the White House's East Room and had a treehouse on the South Lawn. When she invited friends over for slumber parties in her treehouse, Secret Service agents monitored the event from the ground.

Mary Prince (an African American woman convicted of murder, and later exonerated and  pardoned) acted as her nanny for most of the period from 1971 until Jimmy Carter's presidency ended, having begun in that position through a prison release program in Georgia.

Carter did not receive the "hands off" treatment that most of the media later afforded to Chelsea Clinton. President Carter mentioned his daughter during a 1980 debate with Ronald Reagan, when he said he had asked her what the most important issue in that election was and she said, "the control of nuclear arms".

Once, when asked by a reporter whether she had any message for the children of America, she looked at the reporter square in the eyes, thought for a few moments, and said, "No."

On February 21, 1977, during a White House state dinner for Canadian Prime Minister Pierre Trudeau, nine-year-old Amy was seen reading two books, Charlie and the Great Glass Elevator and The Story of the Gettysburg Address, while the formal toasts by her father and Trudeau were exchanged. Some saw it as an affront to foreign guests.

Activism 
Carter later became known for her political activism. She participated in sit-ins and protests during the 1980s and early 1990s that were aimed at changing U.S. foreign policy towards South African apartheid and Central America. Along with activist Abbie Hoffman and 13 others, she was arrested during a 1986 demonstration at the University of Massachusetts Amherst for protesting CIA recruitment there. She was acquitted of all charges in a well-publicized trial in Northampton, Massachusetts. Attorney Leonard Weinglass, who defended Abbie Hoffman in the Chicago Seven trial in the 1960s, utilized the necessity defense, successfully arguing that because the CIA was involved in criminal activity in Central America and other hotspots, preventing it from recruiting on campus was equivalent to trespassing in a burning building.

Personal life 
Carter illustrated The Little Baby Snoogle-Fleejer, her father's book for children, published in 1995.

In September 1996, Carter married computer consultant James Gregory Wentzel, whom she had met while attending Tulane; Wentzel was a manager at Chapter Eleven, an Atlanta bookstore, where Carter worked part-time. After she graduated from the Memphis College of Art, the couple moved to the Atlanta area, where they focused on raising their son, Hugo James Wentzel (b. 1999). They divorced and she married John Joseph "Jay" Kelly in 2007. She had another son in 2010.

Since the late 1990s, Carter has maintained a low profile, neither participating in public protests nor granting interviews. She is a member of the board of counselors of the Carter Center that advocates human rights and diplomacy as established by her father.

See also 

 List of children of presidents of the United States

References

External links 

 

1967 births
20th-century American people
20th-century American women
21st-century American women
American political activists
Brown University alumni
Carter family
Children of presidents of the United States
Daughters of national leaders
Living people
Politicians from Atlanta
People from Plains, Georgia
Tulane University alumni
Woodward Academy alumni